Haplochromis spekii is a species of cichlid found in Lake Victoria and the adjacent reaches of the Nile.  This species reaches a length of  SL. The specific name of this species honours John Henning Speke (1827-1864), the English explorer who, with James Augustus Grant, discovered a major source of the Nile was Lake Victoria.

References

spekii
Fish described in 1906
Taxonomy articles created by Polbot